George Modelski was Professor Emeritus of political science in the University of Washington. Modelski was a professor there from 1967 to 1995.

Before working at the University of Washington, Modelski was a senior research fellow at the Institute of Advanced Studies at the Australian National University.

Modelski did work on long-term processes in global politics and economics, as well as the world urban macrodynamics and world system evolution. He was a neorealist. In 2012 he was awarded with the Bronze Kondratieff Medal by the International N. D. Kondratieff Foundation.

Books
Globalization as Evolutionary Process: Modeling Global Change, 2008, co-editor, ;
World Cities -3000 to 2000, 2003, ;
Leading Sectors and World Powers: The Coevolution of Global Economics and Politics with William R. Thompson, 1996, 
World System History: The social science of long-term change, 2000, co-editor, ;Documenting Global Leadership1988, co-editor, ;Seapower in global politics, 1494-1993, 1988, with William R. Thompson,  ;Long Cycles in World Politics 1987 ;  Japanese edition "Sekai shisutemu no dotai", 1991, ;Exploring Long Cycles", 1987, ;
North-South Relations, 1983, co-editor, ;
Transnational Corporations and World Order,1979, editor,  ;
Multinational Corporations and World Order, 1972, editor, 
Principles of world politics 1972, LOC card No. 70-163237;
A theory of foreign policy 1962, LOC card no.62-12472
SEATO: Six Studies, editor, 1962.

References

External links
The committee: Francis Fukuyama, Neil Howe, George Modelski, Arthur Schlesinger Jr., and William Strauss. Moderated by Herbert Stein. An article in Slate magazine.

1926 births
2014 deaths
Alumni of the London School of Economics
American political scientists
N. D. Kondratieff Medal laureates
People from Poznań
Polish emigrants to the United States
Theoretical historians
University of Washington faculty